Rosemarie Castoro (born in Brooklyn, New York, United States; 1939 – 2015) was an American artist associated with the New York Minimalists. She worked in drawing, painting, sculpture, and other media. She was associated with Minimalism, Conceptual art, and concrete poetry. Castoro was a practitioner of monochrome painting and abstraction. Movement of the human body through physical space was a recurring theme in her work.

Life and work

Castoro graduated from Pratt Art Institute in 1963.

In the 1960s, she participated in several performances with Minimal Dance pioneer Yvonne Rainer and became involved with the study of choreography at the Pratt Institute. Castoro graduated from the Pratt Institute, cum laude, with a BFA in 1963. She was involved with the Art Workers Coalition which met in her studio at 151 Spring Street. In the 1970s, Castoro developed a strong focus on sculpture. In 1971, she created a series of giant minimal sculptures called Free Standing Wall Pieces which encouraged performative interaction. The surfaces of the panels are treated with graphite, gesso and marble dust, thickly applied creating massive rough brush strokes. According to a statement made by her gallery representative, “she was acutely aware that women artists working in a formalist style milieu were not spared the gender-based dismissal of the time,” even while she remained “strictly dedicated to her non-representational abstract style of work.”

Rosemarie Castoro at Artpark 
Castoro's work, Flashers, is featured in the 1979 poster of Artpark under the title, "Public Sculpture for the Post-Heroic Age". Artpark features sculptural, performance art, and public art. Castoro made these sculptures— seven-foot-tall figurative black forms of galvanized sheet metal—for Artpark. In this exhibition, on view in New York from May 13–November 13, 1983, Castoro provided a voice for figurative art and a medium for its exploration.

Collections
Museum of Modern Art, New York
Newark Museum, New Jersey
Cornell Fine Arts Museum, Winter Park, Florida
University Art Museum, Berkeley
Centre national des arts plastiques, Paris
Collection U.S. Embassy
Smithsonian American Art Museum, Washington, D.C.

Grants
Guggenheim Fellowship, 1971
New York State Council on the Arts 1972, 1973
National Endowment for the Arts, 1975, 1985
Tiffany Foundation, 1977
Pollock-Krasner Foundation, 1989, 1998

References

External links

1939 births
2015 deaths
American artists
American people of Italian descent
Pratt Institute alumni
Minimalist artists